The Duchess of Kent Children's Hospital at Sandy Bay is a pediatric hospital in Sandy Bay on Hong Kong Island in Hong Kong.

The hospital is currently the only specialist pediatric hospital in Hong Kong. Founded in 1955 by the Society for the Relief of Disabled Children, it provides specialist services in pediatric orthopedics, spinal surgery, pediatric neurology, developmental pediatrics and pediatric dental surgery while also providing treatment, rehabilitative services and accommodation for patients over 18 years old, specifically orthopedic patients with spinal problems.

History
Its reputation was built first in the 1950s and 1960s, when it became known as the clinical research center that developed the “Hong Kong Operation”, a breakthrough anterior approach to treat spinal tuberculosis, something that was then rife in Hong Kong's refugee squatter camps. Orthopedic teams from the University of Hong Kong’s Department of Surgery (the forerunners of today’s Department of Orthopaedics and Traumatology at the University of Hong Kong’s Medical Centre) working at the hospital pioneered the operation, most notably the “Hodgson/Yau” surgical team of Dr (later Professor) A. R. Hodgson and Dr (later Professor) Arthur Yau Meng-choy. The pair's ground-breaking anterior approach was adopted across the world.,

Until 1971, the facility was known as the “Sandy Bay Children’s Convalescent Home”. During this time, it was a voluntary aided facility. The nursing teams came from the Irish Catholic religious order, The Missionary Society of St. Columban, while the majority of the day-to-day funding came from the Society for the Relief of Disabled Children, who, under the enigmatic leadership of the society's president, stockbroker Noel Croucher, ran a series of high-profile events to raise the home's profile. In 1970, Katharine, Duchess of Kent visited and when the facility upgraded from “Convalescent Home” to “Hospital” in 1971, it took her name. The Duchess remains the hospital patron. Colloquially, because of its location and its name changes, it is often simply referred to as “Sandy Bay”.

The Hong Kong Hospital Authority has managed the day-to-day affairs of The Duchess of Kent Children's Hospital since 1991, while the Society for the Relief of Disabled Children continues to support the hospital “with specific needs or in emerging areas of child health that are not readily available in the public health care system”.

Nowadays
Today, the pioneering spinal work continues. The hospital's Centre for Spinal Disorders provides comprehensive multidisciplinary service in the assessment, treatment and rehabilitation of patients with spinal problems and also carries out clinical research and educational programs. It is the only such facility in the region.

The Children's Habilitation Institute provides habilitation and rehabilitation programs for children with various neuro-developmental problems. It is the only such public health facility in Hong Kong and serves as a model center for habilitation and rehabilitation of children with chronic handicap in China and across Asia.

The Duchess of Kent Children's Hospital is affiliated with the Li Ka Shing Faculty of Medicine at the University of Hong Kong and provides clinical attachment opportunities for the Faculty's medical students.

References

Further reading
 Dr Louis Hsu and Richard Cook. Fifty Years at Sandy Bay: The ongoing story of the Society for the Relief of Disabled Children. WordAsia Publishing.

External links
 The Duchess of Kent Children’s Hospital
 Society for the Relief of Disabled Children
 Hong Kong Hospital Authority

Hospital buildings completed in 1955
Hospitals in Hong Kong
Children's hospitals in China
Hospitals established in 1955
Sandy Bay, Hong Kong
Orthopedic surgical procedures
Children's hospitals in Hong Kong
1955 establishments in Hong Kong